David Ferrer was the three-time defending champion, but lost in the semifinals to Lu Yen-hsun.

John Isner won the title, defeating Lu in the final, 7–6(7–4), 7–6(9–7). It was the 8th career title for Isner, the 2nd in Auckland having previously won in 2010, and only his 2nd outside the United States.

Seeds
The top four seeds receive a bye into the second round.

Draw

Finals

Top half

Bottom half

Qualifying

Seeds
All seeds receive a bye into the second round.

 Daniel Gimeno-Traver (qualified)
 Lukáš Lacko (qualified)
 Donald Young (qualified)
 Bradley Klahn (qualified)
 Steve Johnson (qualifying competition, lucky loser)
 Hiroki Kondo (second round)
 Jose Statham (Received wildcard into main draw)
 Michael Venus (qualifying competition)

Qualifiers

Lucky loser
  Steve Johnson

Qualifying draw

First qualifier

Second qualifier

Third qualifier

Fourth qualifier

References
 Main Draw
 Qualifying Draw

2014 Heineken Open